Wood End, is a small village in Warwickshire, England. It is situated north of Coventry. The village is part of the civil parish of Fillongley. There is a public house called the "Weavers Arms".

Villages in Warwickshire